The featherweight was the third-lightest boxing weight class held as part of the Boxing at the 1904 Summer Olympics programme. It was the first time the event, like all other boxing events, was held in Olympic competition. Featherweights had to be less than 56.7 kilograms. There were three entrants in this competition.

Results

References

Sources
 

Featherweight